Tatra Volunteer Search and Rescue is a non-profit mountain rescue organization in Poland, rescuing stranded mountain climbers, tourists, and others in need of rescue in the Polish Tatra mountains.
It is one of the oldest mountain rescue associations in the world.

Each potential rescuer is required to complete a special training course (lasting between 1.5 and 3 years), in which every volunteer is to exhibit excellent knowledge in Tatra topography as well as practical abilities including climbing, skiing, spelunking, lifesaving and first aid. After completing the training the rescuer takes an oath on the director's hand.

In 2011 TOPR consisted of around 250 members, 140 of whom had acquired permission to participate in rescue missions. The majority of the rescuers are volunteers; only 33 are professional rescuers.

TOPR is one of the few organizations in the world that does not require a mountain insurance policy and does not charge payment for the rescue.

History 

The initial project launch of the mountain rescue association began in 1908. The death of a Polish composer Mieczysław Karłowicz by avalanche hastened the creation of the organization, which was ultimately registered on 29 October 1909 in Lwów, Poland. under its current name with Kazimierz Dłuski as the president and Mariusz Zaruski as the director. The TOPR headquarters, Dworzec Tatrzański, are located in Zakopane.

The heroic sacrifice was in vain as the mountaineer, Stanisław Szulakiewicz, was dead by the time the team reached him.

During the first few years TOPR consisted of only 11 rescuers. The number of volunteers increased until in 1939, 20 years after its launch, TOPR had 50 trained rescuers.

In 1939, after the World War II outbreak, TOPR ceased to function and people of Zakopane scattered across the country. In 1940, during the German occupation of Poland, Germany was able to influence TOPR to resume its rescue services and TOPR operated as Freiwillige Tatra Bergwacht for the duration of the war.

In 1952, the Tatra Volunteer Rescue Service was incorporated into the GOPR.

TOPR first used a helicopter during a rescue mission in 1963. Tadeusz Augustyniak, an experienced rescue pilot and an honorary member of the organization, operated the SM-1. The vehicle transported a tourist with a broken leg from the Valley of the Five Lakes to a hospital in Zakopane.

In 1974, the rescuers adopted Cygan, a dog with avalanche rescue license. Cygan was a German Shepherd.

In 1991, TOPR became an independent organization and was withdrawn from GOPR. A year later, the President of Poland, Lech Wałęsa, awarded the Tatra rescuers with a PZL W-3 Sokół. The new vehicle had a more advanced hovering system than the MI-2 used prior, and thus made rescue missions in the higher, less accessible areas of the mountains safer. PZL W-3 Sokół had an increased weight capacity as well, allowing the transport of more rescuers. Less than 3 years later, the aircraft crashed during a rescue operation. Two pilots (Bogusław Arendarczyk and Janusz Rybicki) and 2 rescuers (Janusz Kubica and Stanisław Mateja) were killed.

In 1999 Tatra Search and Rescue was incorporated in International Commission for Alpine Rescue (IKAR).

The most tragic disaster in the Tatra mountains occurred in January 2003. During the second day of the rescue mission, a critical error occurred in one of the helicopters, "Sokół", halting the functions of both of the engines. The pilot, Henryk Serda, was able to perform autorotation landing, causing major damage to the vehicle but avoiding harm to any terrestrial objects. Shortly after the incident the pilot was fired for breaking the aviation safety laws. Henryk re-appealed and was found innocent due to discrepancies in the officials' reports. A vehicle inspection, confirmed by the manufacturer, raised the possibility "Sokół" may have not been maintained properly. This tragedy was adapted into a movie, "Cisza" (The Silence), premiered in 2010.

References

External links 
TOPR Official Site
Video of the TOPR rescue

Mountain rescue agencies
Emergency services in Poland
Volunteer search and rescue organizations
1909 establishments in Poland
Tatra Mountains